Attila Filkor (born 12 July 1988) is a Hungarian professional footballer who plays as a midfielder for Budafok II.

Club career

Early career 
Born in Budapest, Filkor started playing football with local side MTK, before joining Maltese club Pièta Hotspurs on 22 August 2006 on free transfer. Before he moved to Malta, Internazionale had contacted MTK for a possible transfer of Filkor in July 2006. As Pièta Hotspurs ranked category 3 in FIFA training compensation distribution scheme, Hotspurs supposed to pay MTK €70,000 (€30,000 times 2 seasons plus €10,000) and if Internazionale signed directly, it supposed to pay MTK €160,000 (average of category 1 and 2 times 2 seasons plus €10,000) as training compensation. MTK alleged that the transfer to Malta was the plan of Inter to save cost on training compensation regulated by FIFA.

Internazionale 
On 25 August 2006, he was transferred to Internazionale for €90,000 (and ITC arrived on 31 August), where he played in their youth team. During the season, he made also his first-team debut in a 2006–07 Coppa Italia game against Messina, on 9 November 2006.

However, failing to get much playing time, in January 2008 he was loaned out to Serie B side Grosseto in order to gain some first team experience. During his six months at Grosseto, Filkor won a total of 14 first team appearances, but only four of them as a starter.

For the 2008–09 season, Inter loaned Filkor out again, this time to Sassuolo, a newly promoted Serie B team. He made a total of 15 league in one season and a half spent at the club, before leaving for Gallipoli, on another loan spell, for the remainder of the 2009–10 season.

On 30 July 2009, the Court of Arbitration for Sport ordered Inter to pay MTK €144,000 for training compensation (€160,000 times 90% due to MTK fault).

Milan 
In July 2010, he completed a move to crosstown rivals A.C. Milan, along with fellow Internazionale players Cristian Daminuţă and Marco Fossati for a combined fee of €7 million. (Filkor was valued €1 million.) However, soon thereafter, he was loaned to Serie B side Triestina for the season. In July 2011 he was loaned out again to Livorno, another Serie B club. The following season, he was sent on a third straight loan spell in Serie B, this time at Bari. However, during the January transfer window he was called back and loaned to Pro Vercelli. For 2013–14 season he moved to France, joining Ligue 2 side Châteauroux on loan. On 1 September 2014 he was signed by Avellino.

Return to Hungary 
In summer 2015 Filkor was signed by Újpest FC. In summer 2016 he was signed by Gyirmót SE.

International career 

Filkor was called up for the Hungary national football team in 2007. He was on the bench against Canada, in a match between the two sides on 15 November 2006. He made his international début on the pitch on 7 February 2007 in the last 5 minutes of a 2–0 win against Latvia in a friendly. He has also captained the Hungarian U-19 side.

References

External links 
 
 Profile at aic.football.it 
 
 
 

1988 births
Footballers from Budapest
Living people
Hungarian footballers
Hungary international footballers
Hungary under-21 international footballers
Hungary youth international footballers
Association football midfielders
Pietà Hotspurs F.C. players
Inter Milan players
F.C. Grosseto S.S.D. players
U.S. Sassuolo Calcio players
A.S.D. Gallipoli Football 1909 players
A.C. Milan players
U.S. Triestina Calcio 1918 players
U.S. Livorno 1915 players
S.S.C. Bari players
F.C. Pro Vercelli 1892 players
LB Châteauroux players
U.S. Avellino 1912 players
Újpest FC players
Gyirmót FC Győr players
Budafoki LC footballers
Serie B players
Ligue 2 players
Nemzeti Bajnokság I players
Nemzeti Bajnokság II players
Hungarian expatriate footballers
Hungarian expatriate sportspeople in Malta
Expatriate footballers in Malta
Hungarian expatriate sportspeople in Italy
Expatriate footballers in Italy
Hungarian expatriate sportspeople in France
Expatriate footballers in France